Aglossodes is a genus of snout moths. It was described by Ragonot, in 1891. It is known from Sierra Leone, South Africa, and Kenya.

Species
 Aglossodes duveti (Rougeot, 1977)
 Aglossodes mocquerysi (Leraut, 2009)
 Aglossodes navattae (Rougeot, 1977)
 Aglossodes pineaui (Rougeot, 1977)
 Aglossodes prionophoralis (Ragonot, 1891)
 Aglossodes rougeoti (Leraut, 2009)

References

Pyralinae
Pyralidae genera